Bishwanath Singh (died 1999) was an Indian heavyweight freestyle wrestler and Indian Army servicemember. In 1966 he won a silver medal at the Asian Games and a bronze at the Commonwealth Games. He also won silver medals at the 1970 and 1974 Commonwealth Games. He should not be confused with fellow wrestlers Bishambar Singh and Bhim Singh who competed in the same period, but in different weight categories. He was born in a village called Dumrahar (Near Darauli) in Siwan, Bihar.

References

Year of birth missing
Indian male sport wrestlers
Wrestlers at the 1966 British Empire and Commonwealth Games
Wrestlers at the 1970 British Commonwealth Games
Wrestlers at the 1974 British Commonwealth Games
Commonwealth Games silver medallists for India
Commonwealth Games bronze medallists for India
Asian Games silver medalists for India
Asian Games medalists in wrestling
Wrestlers at the 1966 Asian Games
Wrestlers at the 1974 Asian Games
Medalists at the 1966 Asian Games
Commonwealth Games medallists in wrestling
People from Siwan, Bihar
1999 deaths
Medallists at the 1966 British Empire and Commonwealth Games
Medallists at the 1970 British Commonwealth Games
Medallists at the 1974 British Commonwealth Games